The 1964 Los Angeles Dodgers finished with a record of 80–82, 13 games behind the National League and World Series Champion St. Louis Cardinals, tied for sixth place with the Pittsburgh Pirates.

Offseason 
 October 14, 1963: Mike Brumley was purchased from the Dodgers by the Washington Senators.
 December 6, 1963: Bill Skowron was purchased from the Dodgers by the Washington Senators.
 December 13, 1963: Dick Scott was traded by the Dodgers to the Chicago Cubs for Jim Brewer and Cuno Barragan,
 Prior to 1964 season: Mike Kekich was signed as an amateur free agent by the Dodgers.

Regular season

Season standings

Record vs. opponents

Opening Day lineup

Notable transactions 
 April 9, 1964: Larry Sherry was traded by the Dodgers to the Detroit Tigers for Lou Johnson and cash.
 September 10, 1964: Ken Rowe was purchased from the Dodgers by the Baltimore Orioles.

Roster

Player stats

Batting

Starters by position 
Note: Pos = Position; G = Games played; AB = At bats; H = Hits; Avg. = Batting average; HR = Home runs; RBI = Runs batted in

Other batters 
Note: G = Games played; AB = At bats; H = Hits; Avg. = Batting average; HR = Home runs; RBI = Runs batted in

Pitching

Starting pitchers 
Note: G = Games pitched; IP = Innings pitched; W = Wins; L = Losses; ERA = Earned run average; SO = Strikeouts

Other pitchers 
Note: G = Games pitched; IP = Innings pitched; W = Wins; L = Losses; ERA = Earned run average; SO = Strikeouts

Relief pitchers 
Note: G = Games pitched; W = Wins; L = Losses; SV = Saves; ERA = Earned run average; SO = Strikeouts

Awards and honors 

1964 Major League Baseball All-Star Game
Don Drysdale starter
Sandy Koufax reserve
TSN Pitcher of the Year Award
Sandy Koufax
TSN National League All-Star
Sandy Koufax

Farm system 

LEAGUE CHAMPIONS: Salem, Salisbury

Notes

References 
Baseball-Reference season page
Baseball Almanac season page

External links 
1964 Los Angeles Dodgers uniform
Los Angeles Dodgers official web site

Los Angeles Dodgers seasons
Los Angeles Dodgers season
Los Angel